Bakasana (Crane pose) (Sanskrit: बकासन, IAST: bakāsana), and the similar Kakasana (Crow pose) (Sanskrit: काकासन, IAST: kākasana) are balancing asanas in hatha yoga and modern yoga as exercise. In all variations, these are arm balancing poses in which hands are planted on the floor, shins rest upon upper arms, and feet lift up. The poses are often confused, but traditionally Kakasana has arms bent, Bakasana (the crane being the taller bird with longer legs) has the arms straight.

Etymology and origins

The names for the asanas come from the Sanskrit words बक baka ("crane") or काक kāka ("crow"), and आसन āsana meaning "posture" or "seat".

While different yoga lineages use one name or another for the asanas, Dharma Mittra makes a distinction, citing Kakasana as being with arms bent (like the shorter legs of a crow) and Bakasana with arms straight (like the longer legs of a crane). B. K. S. Iyengar's 1966 Light on Yoga describes only Bakasana, with straight arms. In Sivananda Yoga, Swami Vishnudevananda's 1960 Complete Illustrated Book of Yoga describes only Kakasana, with bent arms. However, practitioners in the west often mistranslate the Sanskrit "Bakasana" as "Crow Pose".

These balancing poses can be dated at least to the 17th century Hatha Ratnavali, where Bakasana is number 62 of the 84 poses said to have been taught by Shiva.

The 19th century Sritattvanidhi describes and illustrates both Kakasana and Bakasana.

In his 1969 book Asana Pranayama Mudra Bandha, Swami Satyananda Saraswati of the Bihar School of Yoga uses the name Bakasana for a different pose entirely (Dandayamana Janushirsasana, pose 5 in Bikram Yoga).

Description 

These asanas are arm balances. In Crow Pose, the knees rest on the bent elbows. In Crane Pose, the elbows are straight and the knees are just above the shoulders, requiring flexibility in the hips. According to B.K.S. Iyengar there are two techniques for entering the poses. The simple method is by pushing up from a crouching position. The advanced method is to drop down from Shirshasana (yoga headstand). Some vinyasa yoga practitioners jump in and out of Crane/Crow via Downward-Facing Dog Pose. This can be practised in stages.

Variations 

Asymmetric variations include:
 Parsva Bakasana (Side Crane Pose) in which one thigh rests on the opposite upper arm and the other leg is stacked on top of the first.
 Eka Pada Bakasana/Kakasana (One-Legged Crane/Crow Pose respectively) in which one leg remains in Bakasana while the other extends straight back.

Preparation 

The arms and shoulders can be strengthened for Crane/Crow by practising moving from High Plank to Low Plank. Other preparatory poses include Downward Dog Pose, Virasana (Hero Pose), and Malasana (Garland Pose).

Claims

Twentieth century advocates of some schools of yoga, such as B. K. S. Iyengar, made claims for the effects of yoga on specific organs, without adducing any evidence. 
Iyengar claimed that this pose "strengthens the arms and abdominal organs since the latter are contracted."

See also 

 Bhujapidasana – a similar hand-balancing pose, with the feet crossed in front of the body 
 Tittibhasana - a hand-balancing pose with the feet stretched straight out in front

References

Sources

 
 
 

Balancing asanas
Medieval Hatha Yoga asanas
Core strength asanas